Sizwe Zulu (born 12 April 1996) is a South African cricketer. He made his List A debut for Easterns in the CSA Provincial One-Day Challenge on 5 March 2016. He made his Twenty20 debut for Easterns in the 2017 Africa T20 Cup on 25 August 2017.

References

External links
 

1996 births
Living people
South African cricketers
Easterns cricketers
Place of birth missing (living people)